Golf 3 could refer to:
 Volkswagen Golf Mk3, a car
 Actua Golf 3, a video game
 Everybody's Golf 3, a video game
 Golf III, a type of Golf-class submarine